Catherine Mary Walsh is a visually impaired athlete from Ireland. She has competed internationally in both athletics and cycling, winning Paralympic medals in both.

Career
Walsh competed in the 1992 Summer Paralympics, where she won a bronze medal, and the 1996 Summer Paralympics, where she did not secure a medal in track and field. Later, she competed at the 2000 Summer Paralympics, where she earned a bronze medal in the women's Pentathlon - P13 event. However, in 2007, she switched from a track and field athlete to a cycling athlete, winning silver at the 2009 International Cycling Federation Para-Cycling Track World Championships.

She continued her success in cycling with a World Championship bronze medal in 2011 and a gold medal in the 3km Individual Pursuit at the UCI Track Cycling World Championships. During the 2012 Summer Paralympics, Walsh earned a silver medal in Women's Individual Pursuit B, and a bronze medal in Women's Time Trial B. She had announced her retirement after these Games.

She won a gold medal at the Strathclyde International Triathlon Union (ITU) World Para Triathlon Event in 2016 and named to Team Ireland's 2016 Paralympic Games PT5 triathlon roster.

References

External links
 

Paralympic athletes of Ireland
Athletes (track and field) at the 1992 Summer Paralympics
Athletes (track and field) at the 1996 Summer Paralympics
Athletes (track and field) at the 2000 Summer Paralympics
Athletes (track and field) at the 2004 Summer Paralympics
Paralympic bronze medalists for Ireland
Living people
Cyclists at the 2012 Summer Paralympics
Paralympic silver medalists for Ireland
UCI Para-cycling World Champions
Medalists at the 1992 Summer Paralympics
Medalists at the 2012 Summer Paralympics
Year of birth missing (living people)
Paralympic medalists in athletics (track and field)

tr:Catherine Walsh